Siyazan (Tat: Siyəzən) is a city, municipality and the capital of the Siyazan District of Azerbaijan. It has a population of 24,900. The city's name is said to be derived from Persian, meaning "White Women", a reference to the original population of Tats. Another explanation links the name with the Persian word siyah, meaning "black".

References

Bibliography

External links

Populated places in Siyazan District